Brickenstein-Leinbach House, also known as L.B. Brickenstein House, is a historic home located at Winston-Salem, Forsyth County, North Carolina.  It was built around 1907 from a plan by Frank Pierce Milburn, and is a -story, three bay, Queen Anne style frame dwelling. It has a high hipped slate roof, projecting bays, and a full-width porch with Corinthian order columns.  A rear addition was built in the 1930s.  The house was moved from 426 Main Street to its present site in 1990.

It was listed on the National Register of Historic Places in 1991.

References

Houses on the National Register of Historic Places in North Carolina
Queen Anne architecture in North Carolina
Houses completed in 1907
Houses in Winston-Salem, North Carolina
National Register of Historic Places in Winston-Salem, North Carolina